Franciscus Hendrikus Gerardus "Frank" de Grave (born 27 June 1955) is a Dutch politician of the People's Party for Freedom and Democracy (VVD) and businessman. He is an Extraordinary Member of the Council of State since 3 September 2018.

De Grave attended a Gymnasium in Assen from March 1967 until May 1973 and applied at the University of Groningen in July 1973 majoring in Law and obtaining a Bachelor of Laws degree in June 1975 before graduating with a Master of Laws degree in July 1979. De Grave was conscripted in the Royal Netherlands Army serving as a Lance corporal from October 1979 until November 1980. De Grave served as chairman of the political youth organisation Youth Organisation Freedom and Democracy (JOVD) from June 1978 until March 1980. De Grave worked as a political consultant for the People's Party for Freedom and Democracy from November 1980 until September 1982. De Grave served on the Municipal Council of Amsterdam from April 1982 until September 1982.

De Grave was elected as a Member of the House of Representatives after the election of 1982, taking office on 16 September 1982. In May 1990 De Grave was appointed as an Alderman in Amsterdam, he resigned as a Member of the House of Representatives the same day he was installed as installed as an Alderman, taking office on 8 May 1990. De Grave served as acting Mayor of Amsterdam from 18 January 1994 until 1 June 1994 following the appointment of Ed van Thijn as Minister of the Interior in the Cabinet Lubbers III. De Grave was appointed as State Secretary for Social Affairs and Employment in the Cabinet Kok I following the resignation of Robin Linschoten, taking office on 2 July 1996. After the election of 1998 De Grave returned as a Member of the House of Representatives, taking office on 19 May 1998. Following the cabinet formation of 1998 De Grave was appointment as Minister of Defence in the Cabinet Kok II, taking office on 3 August 1998. The Cabinet Kok II resigned on 16 April 2002 following the conclusions of the NIOD report into the Srebrenica massacre during the Bosnian War and continued to serve in a demissionary capacity. After the election of 2002 De Grave again returned as a Member of the House of Representatives, taking office on 23 May 2002. Following the cabinet formation of 2002 De Grave was not giving a cabinet post in the new cabinet, the Cabinet Kok II was replaced by the Cabinet Balkenende I on 22 July 2002 and he continued to serve in the House of Representatives as a frontbencher and spokesperson for Finances. In March 2004 De Grave was nominated as Chairman of the Board of directors of the Council for Healthcare Supervision of the Ministry of Health, Welfare and Sport, he resigned as a Member of the House of Representatives the same day he was installed as chairman, taking office on 1 April 2004. In January 2006 the Council for Healthcare Supervision was renamed as the Healthcare Authority with De Grave continuing as chairman of the board of directors, serving from 1 January 2006 until 31 December 2008.

De Grave semi-retired from national politics and became active in the private sector and public sector and occupied numerous seats as a corporate director and nonprofit director on several boards of directors and supervisory boards (DSB Bank, DSM Company, Natura Artis Magistra, Verwey-Jonker Institute, Heart Foundation and the Public Pension Funds PFZW) and served on several state commissions and councils on behalf of the government (SEO Economic Research and the Social and Economic Council). De Grave also worked as a trade association executive for the Medical Specialists association serving as chairman from 25 November 2010 until 1 January 2017 and for the Public Libraries association serving as chairman since 1 November 2010. De Grave was elected as a member of the Senate after the Senate election of 2011, taking office on 7 June 2011 serving as a frontbencher chairing the parliamentary committee for Finances and spokesperson for Economic Affairs, Privatization and Organ transplantation. In August 2018 De Grave was nominated as Member of the Council of State, he resigned as a member of the Senate the same day he was installed as a member of the Council of State, taking office on 3 September 2018.

Decorations

References

External links

  Mr. F.H.G. (Frank) de Grave Parlement & Politiek
  Mr. F.H.G. de Grave (VVD) Eerste Kamer der Staten-Generaal

 

 

 

 

 

 

 

 

1955 births
Living people
Aldermen of Amsterdam
Businesspeople from Amsterdam
Dutch bankers
Dutch corporate directors
Dutch fiscal jurists
Dutch nonprofit directors
Dutch nonprofit executives
Dutch political consultants
Dutch trade association executives
Grand Officers of the Order of Leopold II
Mayors of Amsterdam
Members of the Council of State (Netherlands)
Members of the House of Representatives (Netherlands)
Members of the Senate (Netherlands)
Ministers of Defence of the Netherlands
Municipal councillors of Amsterdam
Officers of the Order of Orange-Nassau
People from Assen
People's Party for Freedom and Democracy politicians
Royal Netherlands Army personnel
State Secretaries for Social Affairs of the Netherlands
University of Groningen alumni
Academic staff of the University of Groningen
20th-century Dutch economists
20th-century Dutch jurists
20th-century Dutch military personnel
20th-century Dutch politicians
21st-century Dutch businesspeople
21st-century Dutch civil servants
21st-century Dutch economists
21st-century Dutch jurists
21st-century Dutch politicians